Caroline Henderson (born 28 February 1962) is a Danish–Swedish pop and jazz singer. She moved to Copenhagen from Sweden in 1983 and spent her youth singing in various jazz bands. Her breakthrough was in 1989 as part of pop group Ray Dee Ohh. After the group disbanded, Henderson launched a solo career with multi award-winning album Cinemataztic (1995) featuring smash hits "Kiss Me Kiss Me" and "Made in Europe".

Follow-up Metamorphing (1998), disco cover album Dolores J - The Butterfly (2000) and the more experimental Naos (2002) didn't have the same commercial impact. A new turn saw Henderson develop into a full-fledged jazz singer on albums Don't Explain (2003), Made in Europe (2004), Love Or Nothin’ (2006) and No. 8 (2008).

Henderson has also appeared as an actress in plays and films.

Personal life
Henderson was born in Sweden to an African-American father and a Swedish mother. She moved to Denmark in 1983, and has spent most of her life there with two children.

Awards
2010: Order of the Dannebrog

Discography

Albums

Singles

Filmography
2006: Der var engang en dreng – som fik en lillesøster med vinger as Snow White
2007: Tuya siempre as Gloria Cole
2008: Max Pinlig as Ofelias tante
2012: Julestjerner (TV series, 24 episodes) as Kim
2022: Vikings: Valhalla as Jarl Haakon

References

External links 
Official site
Caroline Henderson at Myspace
Caroline Henderson at last.fm
Caroline Henderson at IMDb

1962 births
Living people
Danish jazz singers
20th-century Danish women singers
Danish pop singers
Swedish emigrants to Denmark
Swedish people of African-American descent
Danish people of American descent
English-language singers from Denmark
21st-century Danish women singers
RCA Records artists
Stunt Records artists